The Tamarind Falls or Tamarin Falls are a scenic attraction of southwest Mauritius. They are a series of seven cataracts located on the Rivière Tamarin, two kilometers northwest of the large lake Mare aux Vacoas.

Waterfalls of Mauritius